Syvde is a former municipality in Møre og Romsdal county, Norway.  The municipality existed from 1918 until its dissolution in 1964. The  municipality included the areas surrounding the Syvdsfjorden in the eastern part of the present-day Vanylven Municipality. The administrative centre of the municipality was the village of Myklebost, at the end of the fjord.  Syvde Church was the municipal church.

History
The municipality of Syvde was established on 1 February 1918 when the old Vanylven Municipality was split into two municipalities: Vanyvlen and Syvde.  Initially, Syvde had a population of 1,260. During the 1960s, there were many municipal mergers across Norway due to the work of the Schei Committee. On 1 January 1964, all of Syvde Municipality (population: 1,458), all of Rovde Municipality located south of the Rovdefjorden (population: 436), and all of Vanylven Municipality (population: 2,003) where merged into a new, larger Vanylven Municipality.

Name
The name Syvde comes from the local fjord, Syvdsfjorden. The name was historically spelled "Søvde".

Government
All municipalities in Norway, including Syvde, are responsible for primary education (through 10th grade), outpatient health services, senior citizen services, unemployment and other social services, zoning, economic development, and municipal roads.  The municipality is governed by a municipal council of elected representatives, which in turn elects a mayor.

Municipal council
The municipal council  of Syvde was made up of 17 representatives that were elected to four year terms.  The party breakdown of the final municipal council was as follows:

See also
List of former municipalities of Norway

References

Vanylven
Sunnmøre
Former municipalities of Norway
1918 establishments in Norway
1964 disestablishments in Norway